Orani is a comune (municipality) in the Province of Nuoro in the Italian region Sardinia, located about  north of Cagliari and about  southwest of Nuoro.

Orani sits at an altitude of 526 meters, at the foot of Mount Gonare, in the heart of the Barbagia region. Among the notable archaeological sites in the area are approximately 30 nuraghi and several “tombs of the giants”. The Sanctuary of Our Lady of Gonare at the crest of the mountain is of particular interest, as is the natural landscape on the road leading up to it. Orani excels in handicrafts. It is famous for its stonework, carpentry, and metalwork, and for tailors specializing in the use of traditional Sardinian velvet. The city is also home to the Nivola Museum.

Orani borders the following municipalities: Benetutti, Bolotana, Illorai, Mamoiada, Nuoro, Oniferi, Orotelli, Ottana, Sarule.

Demographic evolution

Personalities related to Orani

Mario Delitala (Orani 1887 - Sassari 1990), painter.
Costantino Nivola (Orani 1911 - Long Island 1988), artist.
Piero Borrotzu (Orani 1921 - Sesta Godano 1944), war hero.
Daniela Murru (Orani 1922), writer.
Salvatore Niffoi (Orani 1950), writer.

References

Cities and towns in Sardinia